The 1968 Australia Cup Final was the seventh and final Australia Cup Final, the final matches of the 1968 Australia Cup. The first leg was played at Wentworth Park in Sydney, Australia, on 27 October 1968 and the second leg was played at Middle Park in Melbourne, Australia, on 3 November 1968 contested by Sydney Hakoah and Melbourne Hakoah. Sydney won the final 6–1 on aggregate.

Route to the final

Sydney Hakoah

Melbourne Hakoah

Matches

Details

First leg

Second leg

References

1968 in Australian soccer
Soccer in Sydney
Soccer in Melbourne
October 1968 sports events in Australia
November 1968 sports events in Australia
Australia Cup (1962–1968) finals